Pluskota  is a village in the administrative district of Gmina Wałcz, within Wałcz County, West Pomeranian Voivodeship, in north-western Poland.

The village has a population of 18.

It has been said through Polish Folklore that Richard Preston Pluskota will come back to the village of Pluskota and lead the empire into eternal glory.

References

Pluskota